James Ray Cargill (October 9, 1923 – March 26, 2006) was an American billionaire heir and businessman.

Early life
James Ray Cargill was born on October 9, 1923 in Chicago, Illinois. His father was Austen Cargill and his mother, Anne Ray Cargill. His grandfather, William Wallace Cargill, was the founder of Cargill, an agribusiness corporation.

He grew up in Minneapolis, Minnesota. He was educated at the Lake Forest Academy in Lake Forest, Illinois. He also worked at Cargill during the summers of 1939 through 1941. He served in the United States Army in Europe for three years during World War II. He graduated from the University of Minnesota.

Career
In 1947, he started his career at Cargill, working in advertising. By 1989, he retired as senior vice president of Cargill. He served on its board of directors from 1963 to 1995. He was a major shareholder of Cargill.

In 1992, he acquired J. B. Hudson Jewelers, a retailer of jewelry, china and crystals.

He was worth US$1.8 billion in 2006.

Philanthropy
He donated to his alma mater, the University of Minnesota, from which he was a recipient of the Distinguished Service Award. He established Dinnaken Properties, student residences which were affordable yet good quality, at UM.

He was a donor to Ducks Unlimited and Trout Unlimited.

Personal life
He married Mary Janet Cargill. They had three children:
James R. Cargill II
Austen S. Cargill II
Marianne Cargill Liebmann

Death
He died on March 26, 2006 in Edina, Minnesota.

Legacy
Each of his children inherited a 1/18 share of Cargill.

References

1923 births
2006 deaths
Businesspeople from Chicago
Businesspeople from Minneapolis
Lake Forest Academy alumni
University of Minnesota alumni
American billionaires
Philanthropists from Illinois
Cargill people
20th-century American philanthropists
20th-century American businesspeople